Schwan may refer to:

People
Christian Friedrich Schwan, German publisher
Gesine Schwan, German professor
Haley Schwan, American ballet dancer
Heinrich Christian Schwan, German-American religious figure
Herman P. Schwan, German-American scientist
Ivyann Schwan, American actress
Michael Schwan, German Olympic rower
Severin Schwan, Swiss businessman
Theodore Schwan, American military man

Other uses
Schwan (ship, 1932), a former car ferry on Lake Zurich, Switzerland 
, a German cargo ship in service 1938–39
Schwan (ship, 1939), a former passenger ship on Lake Zurich, Switzerland
Schwan (ship, 1969), a car ferry on Lake Zurich, Switzerland
The German name for the swan, a large water bird 
The Schwan Food Company
the Schwan Super Rink, largest ice complex in the world

See also
Schwann (disambiguation)

German-language surnames